Jonathan Lindsay  (born 16 October 1992 in Bellshill, Scotland) is a professional footballer who plays for Larkhall Thistle.

Career
Lindsay began his career with St Johnstone where he made his debut aged just sixteen before being sent out on loan to Dumbarton.

Dumbarton (loan)
In January 2011 Lindsay was sent out on an emergency loan to Dumbarton. The abandonment of matches due to poor weather led to him staying for an extra month. Due to this he only made two appearances for Dumbarton.

Partick Thistle
On 26 May 2011 after being freed by St Johnstone Lindsay joined Partick Thistle on a two-year contract, becoming the first signing made by new manager Jackie McNamara. On 9 August 2011 he made his debut against Hamilton in the Challenge Cup.

Stalybridge Celtic
Lindsay joined Stalybridge Celtic for the 2012–13 season.

Career statistics

External links

References

1992 births
Living people
Scottish footballers
Scottish Football League players
Partick Thistle F.C. players
St Johnstone F.C. players
Dumbarton F.C. players
Stalybridge Celtic F.C. players
Brechin City F.C. players
Arbroath F.C. players
Scottish Professional Football League players
Association football defenders